Miroslav Šuput (born 1948) is a Slovene painter and illustrator.

He won the Levstik Award in 1989 for his illustrations in Alexander Grin's story Begavka po valovih (She Who Runs on the Waves).

Selected Illustrated Works

 V osemdesetih dneh okoli sveta (Around the World in Eighty Days), written by Jules Verne, 2005
 Argonavti (Argonauts), written by Dane Zajc, 1999
 Brbi gre po barve (Brbi Find Some Colours), written by Samo Kuščer, 1994
 Žalostni princ (The Sad Prince), written by Barbara Andrews, 1993
 Begavka po valovih (She Who Runs on the Waves), written by Alexander Grin, 1989
 Mlin na veter (The Windmill), written by Stevan Raičković, 1988
 Morska dežela na železniški postaji (The Land of Sea at the Railway Station), written by Mate Dolenc, 1986
 Sveti trije kralji  (The three Wise Men), written by Michel Tournier, 1989
 Kanglica kaše (The Bucket of Porrige), written by Kristina Brenk, 1986

References

Slovenian artists
Slovenian illustrators
Living people
1948 births
Levstik Award laureates